Mark Bowden is an author on body language and human behavior. Bowden is credited with pioneering nonverbal analysis of human behavior where it pertains to influence and/or persuasion. His techniques have been used by G7 leaders, including Canadian Prime Minister Stephen Harper.

His work is derived from evolutionary psychology, behavioral psychology, and embodied cognition. Most notable is Bowden's GesturePlane System, or the specific use of open palm hand gestures in what he coins as the "TruthPlane" (the horizontal plane at navel height on the human body) to create feelings of trust, credibility, and confidence when communicating. This model was first put forward in his 2010 book, Winning Body Language.

He is also the President of The National Communication Coach Association of Canada.

Public exposure 
Bowden is a commentator for national news networks globally on the body language of senior politicians. During US Presidential and Canadian Federal elections and debates, along with subsequent diplomatic meetings, he has commented in the international and national press and on network news worldwide on the body language of Donald Trump, Hillary Clinton, Justin Trudeau, and Andrew Scheer. Bowden contributes to GQ magazine on modern male culture and behavior. He has also commented on the nonverbal behavior of Ultimate Fighting Championship mixed martial arts fighters Ronda Rousey, Conor McGregor and Jon Jones for Vox Media's SBNation.

Early life 

Bowden was born in Northampton, England, educated at Weston Favell School, and trained at Middlesex University, London, graduating 1991, (BA Hons, Performing Arts).

Bowden concurrently studied between 1989 and 1995 in London with French masters of physical theatre and the psychology of movement, Philippe Gaulier and Jacques Lecoq; Italian Nobel Prize winner and satirical comedian, Dario Fo; Canadian improvisational theatre master, Keith Johnstone; the British acrobat Johnny Hutch MBE and with Theatre de Complicite.

Performance

Film, theatre, and TV
From 1991 to 2007 Bowden performed in film, theatre, and television, including:

 The 1992 UK London West End premiere of Six Degrees Of Separation at the Royal Court Theatre and the Comedy Theatre.
The Lord of the Rings: The Return of the King (2003).
Yin Yang Yo! (2006).

The Nike Streaker 
Mark Bowden starred in the 2003 Nike Streaker Super Bowl ad, identified by AdWeek as one of the top ten soccer commercials ever made. Shot by British director, Frank Budgen at Millwall Football Club, the ad—in which a streaker (Bowden) clad only in a long scarf and a pair of Nike Shox NZ running shoes darts across the field during an English soccer game, dodging police—prompted calls and emails to Nike asking whether the incident was real. This led to Bowden being awarded a Nude of The Week in Sports Illustrated, and earned him heavy criticism from the US Christian Evangelist activist group, Concerned Women for America who lobbied for Bowden to be banned from US national TV. The ad was voiced by comedian, Steve Coogan. In February, 2003, Reebok released a commercial featuring linebacker Terry Tate that parodies the Nike Streaker commercial; in the Reebok ad, Tate tackles a streaker then proclaims, "You just did it, so I had to hit it". This advertisement was one of several competitive and deliberate spoofs of the Nike Streaker Ad from rival companies.

British Council 
In 2002 Bowden worked as a cultural attache for The British Council in Tel Aviv, Israel at the Habima Theatre, as associate director on Seven Days with controversial Palestinian Arab Israeli actor and film director, Mohammad Bakri in the lead role. Bowden also worked as an adviser to the Arts Council of Great Britain and was supported by The Calouste Gulbenkian Foundation in his arts teaching work across the UK and abroad.

Bibliography

Books 

 Mark Bowden and Tracey Thomson, Truth and Lies: What People Are Really Thinking (HarperCollins, 2018)
 Mark Bowden, Tame the Primitive Brain: 28 Ways in 28 Days to Manage the Most Impulsive Behaviors at Work (Wiley, 2013)
 Mark Bowden with Andrew Ford, Winning Body Language for Sales Professionals: Control the Conversation and Connect with Your Customer―without Saying a Word (McGraw-Hill, 2013)
 Mark Bowden, Winning Body Language: Control the Conversation, Command Attention, and Convey the Right Message without Saying a Word (McGraw-Hill, 2010)

References 

Living people
1970 births
People from Northampton
Alumni of Middlesex University